Rosa 'Diana, Princess of Wales' is a pink blend garden rose, first introduced in 1998 at the British Embassy in the United States.

Naming
The classical hybrid tea rose was bred by Keith W. Zary of Jackson & Perkins and is also known under the names 'Elegant Lady' and 'Jacshaq'.

"15% of the retail price" for buying each of the roses was donated to the Diana, Princess of Wales Memorial Fund. It was also not sold in the United Kingdom in order to prevent from creating a competition with Rosa 'Princess of Wales'.

Description
It has a classic bloom form with ivory petals, and a mild, sweet fragrance.

References

Memorials to Diana, Princess of Wales
Diana Princess of Wales
1998 introductions